Barium chloride is an inorganic compound with the formula . It is one of the most common water-soluble salts of barium. Like most other water-soluble barium salts, it is a white powder, highly toxic, and imparts a yellow-green coloration to a flame. It is also hygroscopic, converting to the dihydrate , which are colourless crystals with a bitter salty taste. It has limited use in the laboratory and industry.

Preparation
On an industrial scale, barium chloride is prepared via a two step process from barite (barium sulfate). The first step requires high temperatures.

The second step requires reaction between barium sulfide and hydrogen chloride:

or between barium sulfide and calcium chloride:

In place of HCl, chlorine can be used. Barium chloride is extracted out from the mixture with water. From water solutions of barium chloride, its dihydrate can be crystallized as colorless crystals.

Barium chloride can in principle be prepared by the reaction between barium hydroxide or barium carbonate with hydrogen chloride. These basic salts react with hydrochloric acid to give hydrated barium chloride.

Structure and properties
 crystallizes in two forms (polymorphs). One form has the cubic fluorite structure and the other the orthorhombic cotunnite structure. Both polymorphs accommodate the preference of the large  ion for coordination numbers greater than six. When cotunnite-structure  is subjected to pressures of 7–10 GPa, it transforms to a third structure, a monoclinic post-cotunnite phase. The coordination number of  increases from 9 to 10.

In aqueous solution  behaves as a simple salt; in water it is a 1:2 electrolyte and the solution exhibits a neutral pH. Its solutions react with sulfate ion to produce a thick white precipitate of barium sulfate.

Oxalate effects a similar reaction:

When it is mixed with sodium hydroxide, it gives barium hydroxide, which is moderately soluble in water.

 is stable in the air at room temperature, but loses one water of crystallization above , becoming , and becomes anhydrous above .  may be formed by shaking the dihydrate with methanol.

 readily forms eutectics with alkali metal chlorides.

Uses
Although inexpensive, barium chloride finds limited applications in the laboratory and industry. In industry, barium chloride is mainly used in the purification of brine solution in caustic chlorine plants and also in the manufacture of heat treatment salts, case hardening of steel. It is also used to make red pigments such as Lithol red and Red Lake C. Its toxicity limits its applicability.

Toxicity
Barium chloride, along with other water-soluble barium salts, is highly toxic. It irritates eyes and skin, causing redness and pain. It damages kidneys. Fatal dose of barium chloride for a human has been reported to be about 0.8-0.9 g. Systemic effects of acute barium chloride toxicity include abdominal pain, diarrhea, nausea, vomiting, cardiac arrhythmia, muscular paralysis, and death. The  ions competes with the  ions, causing the muscle fibers to be electrically unexcitable, thus causing weakness and paralysis of the body. Sodium sulfate and magnesium sulfate are potential antidotes because they form barium sulfate BaSO4, which is relatively non-toxic because of its insolubility in water.

Barium chloride is not classified as a human carcinogen.

References

External links
 International Chemical Safety Card 0614. (anhydrous)
 International Chemical Safety Card 0615. (dihydrate)
 Barium chloride's use in industry.
 ChemSub Online: Barium chloride.

Chlorides
Alkaline earth metal halides
Barium compounds
Inorganic compounds
Pyrotechnic colorants